Phillip Carter (born August 31, 1959) is a former Canadian football running back in the Canadian Football League who played for the Calgary Stampeders. He played college football for the Notre Dame Fighting Irish.

References

1959 births
Living people
American football running backs
Canadian football running backs
Calgary Stampeders players
Notre Dame Fighting Irish football players